is a Japanese animator, character designer and animation director that works at Toei Animation. He is most notable for his episode animation director work on the 1990s Sailor Moon anime series and character design for its fifth and final season. His other notable works include his episode animation direction work for the Pretty Cure series.

Career
Katsumi Tamegai entered the industry in 1987, and provided few key animations for few OVAs. From 1992 to 1996, at Toei Animation, Tamegai provided many episode animation directions and key animations for Sailor Moon series. After Ikuko Itoh's departure, Tamegai became the next character designer for its fifth and final season, Sailor Moon Sailor Stars in 1996.

In 1997, after Sailor Moon had ended, he continued to work at Toei Animation, and provided few episode animation direction for Cutey Honey Flash and Fushigi Mahou Fan Fan Pharmacy. In 1999, Tamegai was chosen as a chief animation director for Phantom Thief Jeanne, which were character designed by Hisashi Kagawa.

From 2004 and onwards, Tamegai worked as a frequent episode animation director for the Pretty Cure series, and character designed each respective movies.

Works

TV Anime

Anime film

OVA (Original Video Animation)

References

External links

1965 births
Living people
People from Kanagawa Prefecture
Japanese animators